Francesco della Sega (1528 – 26 February 1565) was an Italian antitrinitarian executed by the Venetian Inquisition.  He was born in Rovigo.

Works
 Letters

References

1530s births
1565 deaths
Antitrinitarians
16th-century Protestant martyrs